Banishanta Union is a union parishad of Dacope Upazila in Khulna District of Bangladesh.

Geography
Banishanta Union has an area of 6954 acres (18.12 sq km).

References

Unions of Dacope Upazila
Populated places in Khulna Division
Populated places in Khulna District